This is a list of mayors of Aarhus, Denmark since the first mayor was appointed 1886. All but one elected mayors of Aarhus have belonged to the Social Democratic Party.

References

External links 

Aarhus
Aarhus
Lists of political office-holders in Denmark
Politics in Aarhus